Derek Humphry (born 29 April 1930) is a British-born American journalist and author notable as a proponent of legal assisted suicide and the right to die. In 1980, he co-founded the Hemlock Society and, in 2004, after that organization dissolved, he co-founded Final Exit Network. From 1988 to 1990, he was president of the World Federation of Right to Die Societies and is the current president of the Euthanasia Research & Guidance Organization (ERGO).

He is the author of several related books, including Jean's Way (1978), The Right to Die: Understanding Euthanasia (1986), and Final Exit: The Practicalities of Self-Deliverance and Assisted Suicide for the Dying (1991).

Since 1978, Derek Humphry has lived in the United States.

Early years
Born to a British father and an Irish mother, he was raised in Somerset. His education was slender because of a broken home followed by World War II, when many English schools were in chaos, finally leaving at the age of 15, when he became a messenger boy for the Yorkshire Post. In a 30-year journalistic career Humphry worked and wrote for the Bristol Evening World, the Manchester Evening News, the Daily Mail, the Sunday Times and, lastly, the Los Angeles Times.

Personal life
His first wife, Jean Humphry, ended her life on 29 March 1975, in the Cotswolds with her husband at her side, with an intentional overdose of medication; she was suffering from terminal breast cancer. He told that story from his perspective in the best-selling Jean's Way. Derek and Jean Humphry had three sons, the youngest one an adoptee.

Humphry wrote the 1991 suicide handbook, Final Exit. From 1993 onwards Humphry has been president of the Euthanasia Research & Guidance Organization (ERGO), and chairs the advisory board of the new Final Exit Network (formed 2004 to replace the Hemlock Society dissolved the previous year in mergers).

His marriage to his next wife, Ann Wickett, an American and a co-founder of the Hemlock Society, ended in 1989 when she filed for divorce; they had no children. Ann Wickett committed suicide during a recurrence of depression at the age of 49 on 2 October 1991. She had been battling breast cancer, but the cancer was reportedly in remission. 

In early 1990 Humphry married Gretchen Crocker, youngest daughter of an Oregon farming family.

Affiliations
Humphry is an advisor to the World Federation of Right to Die Societies by virtue of his past presidency and in appreciation of his 26 years of involvement with that organization. Since it was founded in 2004, Humphry has been an adviser to the Final Exit Network. After four members of the organization were accused in Georgia of assisting a suicide he launched the Final Exit Liberty Fund which paid most of their legal costs.

In 2014 Derek Humphry was given the Lifetime Achievement Award by the World Federation of Right To Die Societies for "contributing so much, so long and so courageously to our right to a peaceful death." The award was presented by the organization's president, Faye Girsh, at its 20th international conference in Chicago in 2014. It was the first time this award had been made.

Books and publications
Humphry was newsletter editor for the World Federation of Right to Die Societies for a number of years.

As of 2016, the paperback Final Exit was in print in English, Spanish and Italian. It has sold more than one million copies in twelve languages since 1991. In April 2007 the editors and book critics of USA Today selected Final Exit as one of the most memorable 25 books of the last quarter century.
In 2017 he published his life story, Good Life, Good Death: The Memoir of a Right To Die Pioneer (Carrel Books, New York. )

The film Nomadland, which won three Oscars in 2021, makes an error regarding Final Exit. One of the characters explains that she had small-cell lung cancer, that it had metastasized to her brain, and that her doctors have given her seven or eight months to live. Then she says, "I have this book called Final Exit by Dr. Kevorkian. Some people call him Dr. Death. It's like various ways that you can end your life if you need to. It's kind of like a recipe." The author of Final Exit is Humphry, not Dr. Kevorkian.

Derek Humphry bibliography
 Because They're Black (with Gus John; 1972), ; awarded the Martin Luther King Memorial Prize
 Police Power and Black People (with a commentary by Gus John; 1973), 
 Passport and Politics (with Michael Ward; 1974), 
 The Cricket Conspiracy (1975), National Council for Civil Liberties, 
 False Messiah: The Story of Michael X (1977), 
 Jean's Way: A Love Story (1978), 
 The Right to Die: Understanding Euthanasia (1986), 
 Final Exit: The Practicalities of Self-deliverance and Assisted Suicide for the Dying (1991, updated 2002, 3rd edition), 
 Lawful Exit: The Limits of Freedom for Help in Dying (1993), 
 Dying with Dignity (1992), 
 Freedom to Die: People, Politics & The Right-To-Die Movement (1998), 
 Let Me Die Before I Wake (& Supplement to Final Exit; 2002), 
 The Good Euthanasia Guide: Where, What & Who in Choices in Dying (2006), 
 Good Life, Good Death: The Memoir of a Right To Die Pioneer,

See also
 Euthanasia
 George Exoo
 Jack Kevorkian
 Philip Nitschke

References

 Curiosities of Literature, pp. 141, 248–249. By John Sutherland/ Arrow Books 2008. 
 NOTE: For a full and independent biography of Derek Humphry, see Current Biography, Volume 56, Number 3, March 1995
 Derek Humphry's books, manuscripts, papers and documents are archived at Special Collections, Allen Library, University of Washington, Seattle, Washington

External links

 Good Life, Good Death
 Assisted Suicide.org website
 Bowker Biography on Derek Humphry
 Amazon Bibliography for Derek Humphry
 

1930 births
Living people
American male journalists
20th-century American novelists
Assisted suicide
British male journalists
People from Bath, Somerset
Euthanasia activists
Euthanasia in the United States
Persons involved with death and dying
People from Junction City, Oregon
21st-century American novelists
British emigrants to the United States
American male novelists
20th-century American male writers
21st-century American male writers
20th-century American non-fiction writers
21st-century American non-fiction writers